Pierre Mulele (11 August 1929 – 3 or 9 October 1968) was a Congolese rebel active in the Simba rebellion of 1964. Mulele had also been minister of education in Patrice Lumumba's cabinet. With the assassination of Lumumba in January 1961 and the arrest of his recognised deputy Antoine Gizenga one year later, Mulele became one of the top Lumumbists determined to continue the struggle. He went to Cairo as the representative of the Lumumbists' Congo National Liberation Committee based in Brazzaville. From Cairo he proceeded to China in 1963 to receive military training, and also took a group of Congolese youths with him, who received training in guerrilla tactics. Mulele was lured out of exile after  Mobutu promised him amnesty, but Mobutu had him tortured and executed after Mulele returned to the Congo. He was a member of the Bapende ethnic group.

Career

Simba rebellion
In January 1964, a new conflict broke out as Congolese rebels calling themselves "Simba" (Swahili for "lion") rebelled against the government. They were led by Mulele, Gaston Soumialot and Christophe Gbenye, former members of Antoine Gizenga's Parti Solidaire Africain (PSA). 

During the Simba rebellion, Mulele, who had previously undergone training in the Eastern Bloc as well as China, led a Maoist faction in the Kwilu Province. This came to be known as the Kwilu rebellion. Mulele was an avowed Maoist, and for this reason his insurgency was supported by communist China. By the end of April 1964, Mulele's rebellion had been rendered somewhat less dangerous by the government. The Soviet Union, with an embassy in the national capital of Leopoldville, did not support Mulele's Kwilu revolt and had no part in its preparation: lack of support from the Soviets was in the first place responsible for Mulele turning to China as his patron.

Nonetheless, by August the Simba insurgents had captured Stanleyville and set up a rebel government there. However, the Congolese central government requested foreign intervention, and the troops fighting under the command of Soumialot and Gbenye were routed in November 1964, after intense drives by central government troops officered by foreign mercenaries. The landing of Belgian paratroopers in Stanleyville also proved instrumental in the rebels' defeat, as did key military assistance from the United States. On 24 November 1964, five United States Air Force C-130 transports dropped 350 Belgian paratroopers of the Paracommando Regiment onto the airfield at Stanleyville to rescue 2,000 European civilians being held hostage by the Simbas. This move made the United States very unpopular in Africa at the time. After the rebellion's defeat, Mulele fled into exile in Congo-Brazzaville. 

In 1968, then-President Joseph-Désiré Mobutu (later Mobutu Sese Seko) lured Mulele out of exile by promising him amnesty. Mulele returned to Congo-Kinshasa, believing he would be granted amnesty. Instead, he was publicly tortured and executed: his eyes were pulled from their sockets, his genitals were ripped off, and his limbs were amputated one by one, all while he was alive. What was left was dumped in the Congo River.

Ideology and Maoism
When the Kwilu rebellion broke out in 1964, the revolt was led by Mulele in a way reminiscent of the Chinese communist revolutionary codes. Mulele required his fighters to adhere to a very strict moral code, emphasising self-discipline and respect for civilians. The tribal peasant fighters proved difficult to control and many disregarded Mulele's orders. The eight instructions on conduct Mulele issued to his guerrilla fighters showed the great influence Maoist writings regarding "people's war" had on the Kwilu insurgency. Mulele's code of conduct was as follows:
Respect all men, even bad ones.
Buy the goods of villagers in all honesty and without stealing.
Return borrowed things in good time and without trouble.
Pay for things which you have broken and in good spirit.
Do not harm or hurt others.
Do not destroy or trample on other people's land.
Respect women and do not amuse yourselves with them as you would like to.
Do not make your prisoners of war suffer.
The attempt to adapt Maoist Chinese practice to African conditions also extended to Mulele's use of the peasants as the mainstay of his revolution.

Personal life

Mulele was born in Isulu-Matende. He, alongside Antoine Gizenga, received his early secondary education at a seminary in Kinzambi. He continued his education at the Ecole Moyenne de Leverville established by the Huileries du Congo Belge and coordinated under the Brothers of Charity for a further three years.

He married Léonie Abo, a fellow fighter who spent five years in the underground rebel movement alongside guerrillas loyal to Mulele. In 1968, after her husband's assassination, she fled to Congo-Brazzaville where she has since lived. Abo has made a great effort to preserve the memory of her late husband.  The Belgian book Une Femme du Congo (A Congolese Woman), by Ludo Martens, tells Abo's life story.

Notes

References
 Martens, Ludo. Pierre Mulele ou la Seconde Vie de Patrice Lumumba. EPO. (unknown ISBN)
 Martens, Ludo. 10 jaar revolutie in Kongo, 1958-1966: De strijd van Patrice Lumumba en Pierre Mulele. EPO. 

1929 births
1968 deaths
People from Kwilu Province
Maoists
Democratic Republic of the Congo rebels
People of the Congo Crisis
20th-century executions for treason
Executed politicians
People executed by dismemberment
People executed for treason against the Democratic Republic of the Congo
Democratic Republic of the Congo exiles
Democratic Republic of the Congo torture victims
Democratic Republic of the Congo expatriates in the Republic of the Congo
Executed Democratic Republic of the Congo people
Government ministers of the Democratic Republic of the Congo
Lumumba Government members
Maoist theorists
20th-century executions by the Democratic Republic of the Congo
Publicly executed people
Parti Solidaire Africain politicians